Harry Alfred Finch (1907–1949) was a professional rugby league footballer in Australia's leading competition - the New South Wales Rugby Football League premiership in the 1920s and 1930s. Finch was also an Australian international who played for both the Eastern Suburbs and South Sydney clubs.

Playing career
He played 16 matches with Easts’ in the years (1925-6). In his second year at the club Finch, was selected  to  make his state debut for the New South Wales rugby league team in the interstate series against Queensland.

The following season, 1927, Finch transferred to the South Sydney club where he played 62 matches in the years  (1927–30) and (1933–34). Said to be an outstanding winger, Finch was a member of Souths' premiership winning teams in 1927 & 1928.  Finch made his Australian debut after being selected for the 1929–30 Kangaroo tour of Great Britain. He is listed on the Australian Players Register as Kangaroo No. 157. On the tour, Finch didn't play in a Test but did represent Australia in 10 of the minor matches.  Finch is recognized as Eastern Suburbs' 151st player and South Sydney's 143rd player.

Coaching career
After retiring from Sydney football, Finch successfully captain-coached Cessnock to a premiership.

Death
He died suddenly at his home in Pagewood, New South Wales on 23 May 1949, aged only 42.

References

Sources

 

Australian rugby league players
Sydney Roosters players
Australia national rugby league team players
New South Wales rugby league team players
City New South Wales rugby league team players
South Sydney Rabbitohs players
1907 births
1949 deaths
Rugby league wingers
Rugby league centres
Rugby league players from Sydney